The NAB AFL Rising Star award is given annually to a stand out young player in the Australian Football League. The 2014 winner was Lewis Taylor. Taylor polled one more vote than Marcus Bontempelli, making it the closest ever count.

Eligibility
Every round, an Australian Football League rising star nomination is given to a stand out young player. To be eligible for nomination, a player must be under 21 on 1 January of that year and have played 10 or fewer senior games before the start of the season; a player who is suspended may be nominated, but is not eligible to win the award. At the end of the year, one of the 23 nominees is the winner of award.

Nominations

Final voting

References

Afl Rising Star, 2014
Australian rules football-related lists